1914 is a Ukrainian extreme metal band formed in Lviv in 2014. Their songs focuses entirely on World War I, and the group itself was named for the year it began. Musically, 1914 combines the sound of doom, black, and death metal.

History
1914 was founded in summer 2014 in Lviv by Dmytro "Kumar" Ternuschak along with other musicians who already had musical experience and played in various Ukrainian musical groups (Kroda, Skinhate, Ambivalence, Johny B Gut, Stalag 328, Zgard, Disentrail, Ratbite, Toster). In 2015, the band released their debut album Eschatology of War through Archaic Sound. Three years later, their second album, The Blind Leading the Blind, was released. The album received positive reviews from the music press and 1914 soon signed a contract with Napalm Records. The label released their third studio album, Where Fear and Weapons Meet, in 2021, which also received critical acclaim and was later included in several lists of the best albums of the year.

Musical style
1914 plays a mixture of death and doom metal. Black metal influences can also be heard occasionally. The deep tuned, booming guitars and the deep bass are striking. In addition, the band also builds many melodic, often depressing guitar parts into the songs. The typical blast beats from death metal are rather rare, instead the band plays songs in medium or sluggish tempo. Many songs are accompanied by samples, such as speeches or speeches from the First World War, battle or engine noise. The intros (War In) and outros (War Out) on the albums are typical, each representing songs from that time in authentic sound quality.

Members

Current
2nd Division, 147th Infantry Regiment, Senior Lieutenant Dietmar Kumarberg (Dmytro Ternushchak) - vocals (2014–present)
37th Division, Field Artillery Regiment No. 73, watchman Liam Fessen (Oleksa Fisyuk) - guitar (2014–present)
5th Division, Ulanensky Regiment No. 3, Sergeant Vitalis Winkelhock (Vitaly Vigovskyy) - guitar (2015–present)
9th Division, Grenadier Regiment No. 7, non-commissioned officer Armin von Heinessen (Armen Oganesyan) - bass guitar (2014–present)
33rd Division, 7th Thuringian Infantry Regiment. No. 96, Private Rusty Potoplakht (Rostyslav Potoplyak) - drums (2016–present)

Former
First lieutenant Serge Russell (company C, 306th machine gun battalion) (Serhiy) - drums (2014-2016)
Sergeant Andrew Naifman (157th Field Artillery Regiment, 40th Infantry Division) (Andriy Rieznikov) - guitar (2014-2015)
5th Division, Ulanen Regiment No. 3, Sergeant Basil Lagenndorf (Vasil Lahodiuk) - guitar (2015)

Discography
Studio albums
 Eschatology of War (2015)
 The Blind Leading the Blind (2018)
 Where Fear and Weapons Meet (2021)

Other albums
 Ich hatt einen Kameraden (2016, split with Minenwerfer)
 Eschatology of War / Für Kaiser, Volk und Vaterland (2016, compilation)
 Für Kaiser, Volk und Vaterland! (2016, EP)

Singles
 «Caught in the Crossfire» (2014)
 «Frozen in Trenches (Christmas Truce)» (2014)
 «Zeppelin Raids» (2015)
 «Stoßtrupp 1917» (2017)
 «…and a Cross Now Marks His Place» (2021)
 «Pillars of Fire (The Battle of Messines)» (2021)
 «FN .380 ACP#19074» (2021)
 «Flammenwerfer vor!» (2022)

References

Ukrainian death metal musical groups
Doom metal musical groups
Musical groups established in 2014
2014 establishments in Ukraine
Musical groups from Lviv
Napalm Records artists